Andrés Duarte Villamayor (born 4 February 1972, in Asunción) is a retired Paraguayan footballer. A defender, he was a member of the Paraguay national team, competing at the 1992 Summer Olympics in Barcelona, Spain.

Duarte played for Cerro Porteño and River Plate Asunción in Paraguay and Argentinos Juniors and Ferro Carril Oeste in Argentina.

International 
Duarte made his international debut for the Paraguay national football team on 3 March 1993 in a friendly match against Bolivia (1-0 win). He obtained a total number of seven international caps, scoring no goals for the national side.

External links
 Argentine Primera statistics

1972 births
Living people
Paraguayan footballers
Paraguay international footballers
Footballers at the 1992 Summer Olympics
Olympic footballers of Paraguay
1993 Copa América players
Cerro Porteño players
Argentinos Juniors footballers
Ferro Carril Oeste footballers
Paraguayan expatriate footballers
Expatriate footballers in Argentina
Association football defenders